Allophylus natalensis, commonly known as the dune false crowberry or dune false currant, is a species of plant in the genus Allophylus native to south-eastern Africa.

Description
The bark is greyish-brown and may have a smooth texture or develop wrinkles. The smaller branches are greyish-white and downy. The leaflets are leathery and stiff, glossy green above, and pale green below, with shallowly toothed margins. The small fragrant flowers grow in spike-like racemes in the axils of the leaves, and are followed by abundant red, globular berries,  in diameter. Flowering takes place in autumn between March and May and the berries ripen in late winter, between June and August.

Distribution and habitat
This tree is native to the Eastern Cape Province and KwaZulu-Natal in South Africa. Its natural habitat is coastal dune forest and scrub, where it often grows in association with Mimusops caffra, Apodytes dimidiata and Canthium obovatum.

Ecology

The flowers are pollinated by butterflies and the berries are appreciated by both birds, which disperse the seeds, and humans. The larvae of the pearl emperor butterfly (Charaxes varanes subsp. vologeses) feed on the foliage, and the larvae of Corethrovalva goniosema, a moth in the family Gracillariidae, mine the leaves, as do the larvae of Stigmella allophylica, a moth in the family Nepticulidae.

References 

natalensis
Endemic flora of South Africa